The women's 57 kilograms (lightweight) competition at the 2010 Asian Games in Guangzhou was held on 15 November at the Huagong Gymnasium.

Schedule
All times are China Standard Time (UTC+08:00)

Results

Main bracket

Final

Top half

Bottom half

Repechage

References
Results

External links
 
 Draw

W57
Judo at the Asian Games Women's Lightweight
Asian W57